Clyde James Smith (28 January 1901 – 5 January 1935) was an Australian rules footballer who played with Collingwood in the Victorian Football League (VFL).

Smith made one appearance for Collingwood in the 1921 VFL season and six in the 1922 VFL season, then left the club to coach Cobram.

Smith coached Rochester in 1924.

A police constable, Smith was accidentally shot and killed by a colleague's firearm while on duty in Frankston on 5 January 1935.

Notes

External links 

Clyde Smith's profile at Collingwood Forever

1901 births
1935 deaths
Australian rules footballers from South Australia
Collingwood Football Club players
Sturt Football Club players
Accidental deaths in Victoria (Australia)
Australian police officers killed in the line of duty
Deaths by firearm in Victoria (Australia)
Firearm accident victims